Francis Bossman (born 24 June 1984) is a Ghanaian footballer who last played for FK Mornar in the Montenegrin First League.

Club career
Born in Accra, Bossman begin his senior career in 2002 playing with Berekum Arsenal in the Ghana Premier League. His nickname is Makelele. He earned while still young a call to represent the Ghana national team, in 2003. All this contributed for his move to Hearts of Oak in 2004. Same year Hearts won the 2004 CAF Confederation Cup. Bossman will stay in Accra 5 consecutive seasons, winning 4 national championship titles.

In 2009 Bossman moved to New Edubiase United another Ghana Premier League club, but in summer 2010 he decided to accept an offer to move abroad and in the August 2010, he officially signed a contract with Serbian club FK Sloboda Užice for an undisclosed fee.

Ravan Baku
In the Summer of 2012 Bossman joined Ravan Baku of the Azerbaijan Premier League on a two-year contract.

Jagodina
On January 26, 2013, it was announced that Bossman left Ravan Baku to sign a 1.5-year contract for ambitious Serbian side FK Jagodina. However, because of a knee-injury Bossman missed most of the second half of the 2012–13 season and made only one league appearance before being released.

Sloga PM
In September 2013, Bossman signed for newly promoted Sloga Petrovac na Mlavi.

National team
Jojo Bossman played one match for the Ghana national team in 2003.

Honours
Hearts of Oak
CAF Confederation Cup (1): 2004
Ghana Premier League (4): 2004–05, 2005, 2006–07, 2008–09

Jagodina
Serbian Cup (1): 2013

References

External links
 Francis Bossman at Srbijafudbal
 Francis Bossman Stats at Utakmica.rs

1984 births
Living people
Footballers from Accra
Ghanaian footballers
Ghana international footballers
Ghanaian expatriate footballers
Association football midfielders
Berekum Arsenal players
Accra Hearts of Oak S.C. players
New Edubiase United F.C. players
FK Sloboda Užice players
FK Jagodina players
FK Sloga Petrovac na Mlavi players
Serbian SuperLiga players
Expatriate footballers in Serbia
Ravan Baku FC players
Expatriate footballers in Azerbaijan
Serbian First League players
FK Mornar players
Montenegrin First League players